The Sinful Woman, 1916 Italian film 
 The Sinner, 1940 Italian film